Norwegian Pharmacy Association is a trade organization representing the pharmacies and pharmacy owners in Norway. In addition to the three large chains and hospital pharmacies, 20 independent pharmacists are members of the organization.

The Norwegian Pharmacy Association is a trade association for Pharmacies located in Norway. It was established in 1881.

Notable people include Leif Brendel, secretary-general from 1940 to 1968.

References

External links
 Official web site

Medical and health organisations based in Norway
Pharmacies of Norway
Pharmacy-related professional associations
1881 establishments in Norway